Paoskoto (often Paoscoto or Paos Koto) is a village and rural commune in Paoskoto Arrondissement in the Nioro du Rip Department of the Kaolack Region of Senegal, located near the border with the Gambia.

History 
On 30 November 1865, Maba Diakhou Bâ battled against Émile Pinet-Laprade at the Battle of Paoskoto, in a notable historical battle between the natives and the French colonizers.

Geography 
The nearest localities are Keur Oumar Tounkara, Dafar, Keur Gaye Hamdalaye, Mbiteyene, Tayyiba Niassène, Keur bidja Uri Keur Ali Gueye, Nioro du Rip and Diamaguene.

Demographics 
According to PEPAM (Programme d'eau potable et d'assainissement du Millénaire) the rural commune of Paoskoto has a population 43,460 and 4,061 households. The population of the village of Paoskoto amounts to 2,411 inhabitants in 225 households. The Wolof and Fulani tribes form the majority.

Bibliography
 A. K. Mbaye, L’épopée de Maba Diakhou Ba du Rip, mémoire de maîtrise, Dakar, Faculté des Lettres et Sciences humaines, Département de Lettres modernes, 1996
 Kélétigui S. Keita, Maba Diakhou Ba dans le Rip et le Saloum (1861-1867), Dakar, Université de Dakar, 1970, 165 p. (Mémoire de Maîtrise)

External links
 Paoskoto at PEPAM

Populated places in Kaolack Region